Jan Bestry (born 18 May 1954 in Szczecin) is a Polish politician. He was elected to Sejm on 25 September 2005, getting 6941 votes in 4 Bydgoszcz district as a candidate from Samoobrona Rzeczpospolitej Polskiej list. Since his election he missed all of the votings (over 900) in the Sejm, and was elected on an Internet poll by Rmf fm listeners the most lazy deputy in history. As an "award", Bestry received an all expenses paid trip to a survival camp.

See also
Members of Polish Sejm 2005-2007

External links
Jan Bestry - parliamentary page - includes declarations of interest, voting record, and transcripts of speeches.

1954 births
Living people
Politicians from Szczecin
Members of the Polish Sejm 2005–2007
Self-Defence of the Republic of Poland politicians